Brozzi is am Italian surname. Notable people with the surname include:

Bernardino Brozzi (1555–1617), Italian painter
Paolo Brozzi (17th century), Italian painter
Renato Brozzi (1887–1963), Italian sculptor

See also
Bozzi

Italian-language surnames